Forty Little Mothers (French: Le mioche) is a 1936 French comedy film directed by Léonide Moguy and starring Lucien Baroux, Gabrielle Dorziat and Pauline Carton. The 1940 Hollywood film Forty Little Mothers was based on the same story.

Plot summary

Cast
 Lucien Baroux as Prosper Martin  
 Gabrielle Dorziat as Mme Granval, La directrice  
 Pauline Carton as Mlle Clotilde  
 Milly Mathis as Gervaise  
 Madeleine Robinson as Denise Mériel, la mère  
 Jane Pierson as La gérante  
 Georges Vitray as Dalbret  
 Marcel Maupi as Marius Rabut 
 Jean Périer as L'aumônier  
 Pierre Labry as Bourgeon, le père  
 Gilbert Gil as Robert Bourgeon, le fils 
 Marcel Carpentier as Le cuisinier  
 René Bergeron as Le garagiste  
 André Siméon as Le pochard  
 Pierre Juvenet as Le coadjuteur  
 Philippe as Le mioche  
 Nane Germon as Simone  
 Anne Doria as Valentine  
 Wally Carveno as Geneviève  
 Claire Gérard as Le lingère 
 Elisabeth Aumont as Une élève  
 Jenny Carol as Une élève  
 Léonce Corne as Le brocanteur  
 Janine Darcey 
 Aline Debray 
 Foun-Sen as Une élève  
 May Francine 
 Gary Garland 
 Liliane Gauthier 
 Paulette Houry 
 René Lacourt 
 Michèle Morgan as Une élève  
 Jacqueline Pacaud as Une élève  
 Roger Rosen

See also
 Forty Little Mothers (1940)
 Cento piccole mamme (1952)

References

Bibliography 
 Jonathan Driskell. The French Screen Goddess: Film Stardom and the Modern Woman in 1930s France. I.B.Tauris, 2015.

External links 
 

1936 comedy films
French comedy films
1936 films
1930s French-language films
Films directed by Léonide Moguy
Films scored by Michel Michelet
French black-and-white films
1930s French films